The Siracusa–Gela–Canicattì railway is a single-track line in Sicily, Italy managed by RFI. The route connects Syracuse on the Ionian side of Sicily to the Mediterranean side, crossing, with an east-west route, a number of large urban centers to Canicattì.

History of route section openings

Canicattì–Campobello di Licata
Campobello di Licata–Favarotta – 23 May 1880
Favarotta–Licata – 24 February 1881
Syracuse–Noto – 5 April 1886
Licata–Licata jetty – 26 November 1888
Licata–Gela – 29 March 1891
Noto–Modica – 23 December 1891
Syracuse– – 13 August 1892
Gela–Comiso – 14 March 1893
Comiso–Modica – 18 June 1893

See also 
List of railway lines in Italy

References

Further reading
Federico Squarzina, Produzione e commercio dello zolfo in Sicilia nel secolo XIX = production and trade of sulfur in Sicily in the 19th century. ILTE, 1963.
Romualdo Giuffrida, Lo Stato e le ferrovie in Sicilia (1860–1895) = the state and the railways in Sicily (1860–1895). Caltanissetta: Sciascia, 1967.
Piero Muscolino, La ferrovia Siracusa-Vittoria-Caltanissetta = the Syracuse-Vittoria-Caltanissetta railway. Ingegneria Ferroviaria (railway engineering), May 1977, pp. 417–426.
Piero Muscolino, Il treno in Sicilia = the train in Sicily. Ingegneria Ferroviaria (railway engineering), n. 2, Rome: CIFI, 1977.
Piero Muscolino, Le ferrovie della Sicilia sud-orientale = the railways of south-eastern Sicily. Cortona, Calosci, 1979.
Piero Muscolino, Le ferrovie della Sicilia sud-orientale = the railways of south-eastern Sicily. Ragusa, EdiARGO, 2006, .
Giuseppe Barone, Le vie del Mezzogiorno = the ways of the South. Rome: Donzelli, 2002, .
Rete Ferroviaria Italiana, Fascicolo Linea 159. RFI, December 2003.
Massimo Inzerilli, Ferrovie siciliane in abbandono = Sicilian railways in abandonment. In i Treni, n. 356, February 2013, p. 20–26.

External links 

Railway lines in Sicily
Railway lines opened in 1880